This is a list of the first women lawyer(s) and judge(s) in Idaho. It includes the year in which the women were admitted to practice law (in parentheses). Also included are women who achieved other distinctions such becoming the first in their state to graduate from law school or become a political figure.

Firsts in Idaho's history

Lawyers 

First female: Helen Young (1895)  
 First female prosecutor: Kate E. Nevile Feltham (1914) in 1926 
 First female to practice before the U.S. Supreme Court: Mazellah (M.) Pearl McCall (1919) in 1924 
 First female to argue a case before the Supreme Court of Idaho: Adelyne Martha Burrus Champers (1927) in 1929 
First Japanese American female: Rei Kihara Osaki (1943) 
First Hispanic American female: Joanne P. Rodriguez (1983)  
First African American female: Ida Leggett (1986)  
First Native American (Cherokee/Shoshone) female: Cassandra Lee Furr Dunn (1974)

Law Clerks 

 First female to clerk for the Supreme Court of Idaho: Mary Schmitt (1940) in 1941 
 First female to clerk for the U.S. District Court in Idaho: Ina Mae Wheeler Hanford (1952) in 1952

State judges 

 First female (non-attorney judge): Margaret Geisler in 1939  
 First female: Mary Jensen Smith Oldham (1935) in 1945  
 First female (youngest at time of her appointment): Zoe Ann Warberg Shaub (1960) in 1961  
 First female (state magistrate): Linda Cook (1973) in 1976  
 First female (district court): Deborah A. Bail (1975) in 1983  
 First female (Third Judicial District Court): Juneal Kerrick (1981) in 1987  
 First female (Idaho Court of Appeals): Cathy Silak (1976) in 1990  
 First African American (female): Ida Leggett (1986) in 1992  
 First female (Idaho Supreme Court): Linda Copple Trout (1977) in 1992  
 First female (Idaho Supreme Court; Chief Justice): Linda Copple Trout (1977) in 1997

Federal judges 
 First female (United States District Court for the District of Idaho): Candy Dale in 2008

Deputy Attorney General 

 First female (Deputy Assistant): Susan Maria Flandro (1968) in 1968

United States Attorney 

 First female: Betty H. Richardson (1982) from 1993-2001

Assistant United States Attorney 

 First female: Mary Hobson in 1978

Prosecuting Attorney 

 First female: Kate E. Nevile Feltham (1914) in 1926

Idaho State Bar Association 

 First female president: Kaye O'Riordan in 1988

Firsts in local history

 Mary Elizabeth Schmitt (1940): First female lawyer in south-central Idaho (specifically Canyon County, Idaho)
 Karen Jean Orndorff Vehlow (1975): First female appointed as a Deputy Prosecutor (1975) and magistrate (1977) in Ada County, Idaho
 Jan M. Bennetts: First female Prosecuting Attorney for Ada County, Idaho (2014)
 Barbara Buchanan: First female district court judge in Bonner County, Idaho (2013)
 Stacey DePew: First female judge in Jerome County, Idaho (2018)
 Alberta Morton Phillips (1941): First female to teach law at the University of Idaho [Latah County, Idaho]
 Mary Jensen Smith Oldham (1935): First female lawyer in Rexburg, Idaho [Madison County, Idaho]
 Kate E. Nevile Feltham (1914): First female Prosecuting Attorney for Washington County, Idaho (1926)

See also  
 List of first women lawyers and judges in the United States
 Timeline of women lawyers in the United States
 Women in law

Other topics of interest 

 List of first minority male lawyers and judges in the United States
 List of first minority male lawyers and judges in Idaho

References 

Lawyers, Idaho, first
Idaho, first
Women, Idaho, first
Women, Idaho, first
Women in Idaho
Lists of people from Idaho
Idaho lawyers